The  is a tilting diesel multiple unit (DMU) train type operated by Hokkaido Railway Company (JR Hokkaido) on Sapporo area suburban services in Hokkaido, Japan since 1997. The KiHa 201 trains are designed to work in multiple with 731 series electric multiple unit (EMU) sets with which it shares numerous features, including appearance, interior layout, bodyshell and control systems. These daily interworkings are the only diesel-electric multiple working in Japan. To allow them to work alongside faster and more powerful EMUs, KiHa 201 units are uniquely fitted with pneumatic tilting bogies designed by Kawasaki Heavy Industries and used on KiHa 261 series express trains.

Formation
The fleet is formed as four 3-car sets, D-101–104, as follows.

Interior
Seating consists of longitudinal bench seating throughout. The KiHa 201-200 cars are fitted with a toilet. For greater capacity and shorter loading times, features typical to trains in Hokkaido, such as entrance vestibules designed to keep passenger compartments warm, are for the first time replaced by individually-opening semi-automatic doors and infrared heating.

History

The first set was delivered from Fuji Heavy Industries to Naebo Depot in December 1996, and the fleet of four sets entered revenue service from the start of 22 March 1997 timetable revision.

Polycarbonate window covers were fitted to the fleet between June and September 2002.

Services
Multiple workings with 731 series EMUs are currently limited to one single trip a day.

Unlike other DMUs operated by JR Hokkaido, KiHa 201s are not equipped for driver only operation. Services on lines – such as on the Sassho Line pre-electrification – where most trains operate with the driver only still require conductors when KiHa 201s are used.

References

201 series
Hokkaido Railway Company
Tilting trains
Train-related introductions in 1997
Fuji rolling stock